Valdilana is a comune (municipality) in the Province of Biella in the Italian region Piedmont.

Geography 
It borders the following municipalities: Bioglio, Camandona, Campiglia Cervo, Caprile, Crevacuore, Curino, Mezzana Mortigliengo, Pettinengo, Piatto, Piedicavallo, Portula, Pray, Scopello (VC), Strona, Vallanzengo, Valle San Nicolao, Veglio.

History 
The comune of Valdilana was born on 1 January 2019 due to the fusion of four pre-existent comunes: Mosso, Valle Mosso, Soprana and Trivero.

References